Dunston is a small village which lies approximately 3 miles south of Norwich. The population is included in the civil parish of Stoke Holy Cross. It is located in the valley of the River Tas between Stoke Holy Cross and Caistor St. Edmund. It has a common which is popular with walkers.

The villages name means 'Dun(n)(i)'s farm/settlement'.

Parish records for Dunston exist as far back as 1557 but the village is now in the civil parish of Stoke Holy Cross.

Dunston Hall is now a hotel.

Notes 

http://kepn.nottingham.ac.uk/map/place/Norfolk/Dunston

External links
 Dunston Hall
 

Villages in Norfolk
South Norfolk